The Audi Q4 e-tron is a battery electric compact luxury crossover SUV produced by Audi. It is based on Volkswagen Group's electric MEB platform and is the fourth fully-electric model in the Audi e-tron series after the Audi e-tron, e-tron GT and Q2L e-tron. Production began in March 2021, with the production version being unveiled in April 2021.

Overview 
The Q4 e-tron was first shown as a near-series concept vehicle at Geneva Motor Show in 2019. With , the front overhangs are relatively short, allowing for a wheelbase of  while maintaining more compact overall dimensions.

Much of the exterior design such as the spoilers in front of the front wheel arches, the rear spoiler or the bars below the headlights was introduced with vehicle aerodynamics in mind. The Q4 e-tron achieves a drag coefficient of 0.26 in the Sportback version, which is worsened to 0.28 for the regular roofline model. Wheel sizes between 19 and 21 inch are offered.

Optional features include an augmented reality head-up display and an  infotainment screen, which can be controlled via voice commands.

The boot (trunk) holds 520 L of space, which is extended to 1,490 L when folding down the second row seats (40:20:40 split) whereas the Sportback versions obtain 535/1,460 L.

Markets

Europe 
The market launch in Europe is to begin in June 2021, with prices in Germany starting from €41,900 for the base Q4 35 e-tron. The 40 trim is priced beginning from €47,500 and the Q4 50 e-tron quattro from €52,900. In July 2021, Audi began offering a less powerful all-wheel drive version, the 45 e-tron quattro. Sportback models will arrive in late summer and be priced around €2,000 higher.

Two dedicated "Edition" models are available at launch in all drive variants for €6,195 more respectively, offering a blue or grey paint as well as additional exterior changes.

North America 
The Q4 e-tron is set to arrive in the US in late 2021 for the 2022 model year, with prices beginning from under $45,000. In the US, the entry model will be the Q4 40 e-tron - as such exclusively models using the larger 77 kWh battery pack will be offered in the American market.

The EPA estimated range for the dual motor Q4 50 to be  with a combined highway/city rating of 95 MPGe.

China 
For the Chinese market, the Q4 e-tron will be assembled at the FAW-Volkswagen plant in Foshan.

Specifications

Powertrain 
The motor is coupled to a 1-speed transmission with a fixed gear ratio of 13:1 and typically operates with "substantially greater than 90 percent" efficiency.

In most situations, the front motor is not activated in order to increase overall efficiency. Its 1-speed gear is fixed at a ratio of 10:1 while the rear motor in AWD models operates at a ratio of 11.5:1.

When driving, the vehicle by default is set to coast, with recuperation up to 0.15 g being optional.

The motors rotor and stator are produced at the Volkswagen Group Components plant in Salzgitter and are assembled in Kassel, where the 1-speed transmission is built as well. For the Chinese market, the electric drive components are produced in Tianjin.

Battery 
The battery consists of a liquid-cooled Lithium-Ion battery pack which houses either 10 or 12 modules containing the individual battery cells in an aluminium casing.

Whereas the battery system is assembled at Volkswagen Group plants, the Nickel-Manganese-Cobalt (NMC) battery cells are obtained from suppliers such as LG Energy Solution and CATL. For the Zwickau plant, battery cells pre-assembled into modules at LGs Wrocław plant are delivered by train to be assembled into batteries in Braunschweig.

If charged at a public DC fast charger at a rate of 125 kW under ideal conditions, Audi claims that the 82/77 kWh battery pack can charge from 5 to 80 percent in 38 minutes.

Suspension 
The Q4 e-tron uses a MacPherson front and five-link rear suspension.

Towing 

Reviews and reception 
In December 2022, Bloomberg named the Audi Q4 e-tron as a great alternative to the Model Y from Tesla for consumers upset with Elon Musk.

Sustainability 
According to Audi, it is using exclusively "eco-electricity" during production of the Q4 e-tron for Europe and the US in Zwickau, and demands the same from its suppliers. Audi also claims that what it considers "unavoidable" emissions during production are mitigated through purchasing carbon offsets and, based on this, markets the Q4 e-tron as a "net zero carbon emissions" vehicle when handed to European and American customers.

The "Dinamica" microfibre and "Puls" fabric interior options consist of 45 and 50 percent recycled materials, respectively.

References

External links

 Official website (United Kingdom)

Q4 e-tron
Production electric cars
Luxury crossover sport utility vehicles
Compact sport utility vehicles
Rear-wheel-drive vehicles
All-wheel-drive vehicles
Euro NCAP large off-road
Cars introduced in 2021